Jesús Uribesalgo Gutiérrez (born 25 May 1969), commonly known as Josu Uribe, is a Spanish football manager.

Club career
Born in Gijón, Asturias, Uribe began coaching at the age of 21, managing youth sides at local Sporting de Gijón. Subsequently, he coached in amateur senior football, his first achievement being leading Ribadesella CF to the third division in the 2001–02 season, a first-ever for the club.

As a result, Uribe moved straight into the second level with UD Las Palmas. In the 2003–04 campaign he was in charge of Getafe CF as they reached La Liga for the first time in their history, finishing in second position behind champions Levante UD and only losing six games in 42.

From 2004 to 2009, Uribe continued working in division two, with Elche CF, Hércules CF, Deportivo Alavés and SD Eibar, being relegated with the latter after 15 matches in charge. He spent 2009–10 with Cultural y Deportiva Leonesa, in the third tier.

In 2011, Uribe had a fleeting spell in Greek football, leaving Panserraikos F.C. after a few months due to the club's economic problems. In January 2012 he was appointed at Girona FC after the sacking of Raül Agné, with the Catalans ranking in 21st position (ouf of 22 teams) but eventually avoiding second-division relegation.

Personal life
His father  (1938–2005) was a footballer whose teams included Alavés, Levante UD and Sporting Gijón.

Managerial statistics

References

External links

1969 births
Living people
Sportspeople from Gijón
Spanish people of Basque descent
Spanish football managers
Segunda División managers
Segunda División B managers
Association football coaches
UD Las Palmas managers
Getafe CF managers
Elche CF managers
Hércules CF managers
Deportivo Alavés managers
SD Eibar managers
Cultural Leonesa managers
Girona FC managers
Real Avilés CF managers
UD Melilla managers
Super League Greece managers
Panserraikos F.C. managers
Spanish expatriate football managers
Expatriate football managers in Greece
Spanish expatriate sportspeople in Greece